Phra Pradaeng is a district (amphoe) of Samut Prakan province in Thailand.

History
Phra Pradeang was the original center of the area south of Bangkok near the mouth of the Chao Phraya River. Originally named Nakhon Khuan Khan (นครเขื่อนขันธ์), it was settled by Mon people. In 1815, King Rama II built the Pom Phlaeng Faifa Fort at the river's bend. The fort is now a small park and is accessible to visitors.

 

In 1819, the new town Mueang Samut Prakan (or Paknam) was established. Due to economic problems in the early-1930s, several administrative entities were abolished, including Phra Phradaeng Province, which had its districts assigned to Samut Prakan and Thonburi effective 1 April 1932.

A two kilometre tramway across the neck of the Phra Pradaeng river bend opened in 1908 and closed c. 1940. Operated by a private company, the motorised trams connected with motorboat services to Bangkok and to Paknam at each end of the line. The tram cut a considerable time off the up and downriver journey by avoiding the long river bend.

Administration
The district is divided into 15 sub-districts (tambons), which are further subdivided into 67 villages (mubans). The town (thesaban mueang) Phra Pradaeng covers the tambon Talad, the town Lat Luang, the tambon Bang Phueng, Bang Chak, and Bang Kharu. The township (thesaban tambon) Samrong Thai administers tambons Samrong Tai, Samrong, Samron Klang, Bang Hua Suea, and Bang Ya Phraek. There are six tambon administrative organizations (TAO) for the tambon not covered by the municipalities.

Attractions
Bang Kachao
Bang Nam Phueng Floating Market

Notable people
Sompote Sands, film director
Chintara Sukapatana, actress

References

External links

http://www.phrapradaeng.org (Thai only)

Phra Pradaeng